The 2012 United States presidential election in New Mexico took place on November 6, 2012, as part of the 2012 United States presidential election in which all 50 states plus the District of Columbia participated. This was the 25th U.S. presidential election in which New Mexico participated. New Mexico voters chose five electors to represent them in the Electoral College via a popular vote pitting incumbent Democratic President Barack Obama and his running mate, Vice President Joe Biden, against Republican challenger and former Massachusetts Governor Mitt Romney and his running mate, Congressman Paul Ryan.

Prior to the election, 17 news organizations considered this a state Obama would win, or otherwise considered as a safe blue state. President Obama and Vice President Biden carried New Mexico with 52.99% of the vote to Mitt Romney's 42.84%, a victory margin of 10.15%. Libertarian Gary Johnson, a former Republican who served two terms as Governor of New Mexico from 1995 to 2003, garnered 3.55% of the vote, his strongest statewide performance in the nation, and the strongest 3rd party showing in the state since 2000 (although that was easily surpassed by Johnson in 2016, when he received nearly 10% of the vote in New Mexico).

As of 2020, this is the most recent election where Colfax County, Hidalgo County, and Valencia County voted for the Democratic candidate. (Valencia County picked Donald Trump, Obama's successor, in both his 2016 win and 2020 loss, thus ending its reputation as a pivotal bellwether in presidential elections.) Since its statehood in 1912, no incumbent president of either party has ever won another term in office without carrying New Mexico.

Caucuses and Primaries

Democratic caucuses 
The Democratic caucus in New Mexico was uncontested as no one challenged incumbent President Barack Obama for the nomination. As a result, all of the state's 50 delegates were allocated to Obama.

Republican primary 

The 2012 New Mexico Republican presidential primary was proclaimed under state law on January 30, 2012 to take place on June 5, 2012.  Under New Mexico law it is a closed primary, with only registered members of the New Mexico Republican Party being eligible to vote in the Republican primary. 20 delegates were chosen, for a total of 23 delegates to go to the national convention.

Federal offices
 President of the United States: This is a "proportional primary". The twenty delegates to the National Republican Convention are bound proportionally, according to the percentage of votes received, to presidential contenders who receive 15% or more of the primary vote statewide.
 United States Senate: A single candidate to run for the seat formerly held by Jeff Bingaman.
 United States House of Representatives: One candidate from each of the three congressional districts.

Statewide offices
 Court of Appeals: One candidate to run for the unexpired term of Judge Robert E. Robles, currently held by appointee Judge J. Miles Hanisee.
 Public Regulation Commission: One candidate for each of District 1 and District 3 for four year terms.

Results

General election

Candidate ballot access 
 Barack Obama / Joe Biden, Democratic
Mitt Romney / Paul Ryan, Republican
 Gary Johnson / James P. Gray, Libertarian
 Jill Stein / Cheri Honkala, Green
 Virgil Goode / Jim Clymer, Constitution
 Rocky Anderson / Luis J. Rodriguez, Justice

Results

By county

Counties that flipped from Democratic to Republican 

 Luna (largest city: Deming)

Results by congressional district
Obama won 2 of 3 congressional districts.

See also
 2012 Republican Party presidential debates and forums
 2012 Republican Party presidential primaries
 Results of the 2012 Republican Party presidential primaries
 New Mexico Republican Party

Notes

External links
The Green Papers: for New Mexico
The Green Papers: Major state elections in chronological order

New Mexico
United States president
2012